Sohawa Mirza is a town in the Islamabad Capital Territory of Pakistan. It is located at 33° 18' 35N 73° 27' 30E at an altitude of 443 metres (1456 feet).

References 

Union councils of Islamabad Capital Territory